Franz Schrotzberg (2 April 1811, Vienna - 29 May 1889, Graz) was an Austrian portrait painter.

Life and work 
From 1825 to 1831, he was a student at the Academy of Fine Arts. During his time there, he was awarded three prizes and given a scholarship. At the age of nineteen, he became friends with the landscape painter Karl Marko, who had a significant influence on his artistic approach, although he would eventually turn to portrait painting. 

In 1832, he first exhibited some portraits and mythological scenes. Five years later, he made an extended study trip to Italy, then, in 1842, to Belgium. He became a member of the Academy the following year. He also visited London and Paris. By the 1850s, he was one of the most sought-after painters of female portraits in Vienna. 

His opulent style proved to be controversial among his contemporaries, however. In 1903 the art critic Ludwig Hevesi wrote that he was "silky smooth" (seidenglatte), as well as a mild (gelinder) Viennese version of Franz Xaver Winterhalter, and had the luck to make his career by painting a youthful Empress Elisabeth.
 
In addition to painting, he taught at the Academy, where his students included the portrait painter , later said to be his "successor". His paintings of the Habsburgs and other members of the nobility were often reproduced as lithographs by Josef Kriehuber, August Prinzhofer, Adolf Dauthage and Franz Eybl, among others. In 1867, he was awarded the Order of Franz Joseph. A street in Vienna's Leopoldstadt district was named after him in 1899.

He was married to Eleonore Stohl. Their daughter, Helene, married the progressive educator  in 1890.

References

Further reading 
 
 "Schrotzberg, Franz". In: Friedrich von Boetticher: Malerwerke des 19. Jahrhunderts. Beitrag zur Kunstgeschichte. Vol.2/2, Saal–Zwengauer, Boetticher’s Verlag, 1901, pp.664–665 (Online)
 Hans Vollmer (Ed.), "Schrotzberg, Franz", In: Allgemeines Lexikon der Bildenden Künstler von der Antike bis zur Gegenwart, Vol.30: Scheffel–Siemerding, E. A. Seemann, 1936
 G. Frodl: "Schrotzberg, Franz". In: Österreichisches biographisches Lexikon 1815–1950, Vol.11: Schriefer–Schulpe de Törökkanizsa, Verlag der Österreichischen Akademie der Wissenschaften, 1998, pp.263–264 (Online)

External links 

1811 births
1889 deaths
Austrian painters
Austrian portrait painters
Academy of Fine Arts Vienna alumni
Academic staff of the Academy of Fine Arts Vienna
Artists from Vienna